Tiliaceae is a family of flowering plants. It is not a part of the APG, APG II and APG III classifications, being sunk in Malvaceae mostly as the subfamilies Tilioideae, Brownlowioideae and Grewioideae, but has an extensive historical record of use.

All through its existence the family has had a very lively history, with various authors taking very different views on what should be part of this family. As a result, it is recommended when this name is encountered to check what the author means.

However, in the northern temperate regions the name is unambiguous as the only representative is Tilia, the lime or linden.

APG II system
The APG II system, does not recognise this as a family but submerges it in the Malvaceae sensu lato, which unites the four families Bombacaceae, Malvaceae sensu stricto, Sterculiaceae and Tiliaceae. Modern botanical taxonomy, such as the relevant volume in the Kubitzki series which conforms to APG, treats most of the plants that traditionally constitute the family (see above) in the subfamilies Tilioideae, Brownlowioideae, and Grewioideae within this extended family Malvaceae sensu lato. Cladistically, the traditional family Tiliaceae is polyphyletic.

de Candolle system
In the de Candolle system the circumscription of the family was:
 family Tiliaceae
 genus I. Sparmannia [sic: now Sparrmannia]
 genus II? Abatia
 genus III. Heliocarpus
 genus IV. Antichorus
 genus V. Corchorus
 genus VI. Honckenya [sic, see Clappertonia]
 genus VII. Triumfetta
 genus VIII. Grewia
 genus IX. Columbia [sic, now Colona]
 genus X. Tilia
 genus XI. Diplophractum
 genus XII. Muntingia
 genus XIII. Apeiba
 genus XIV. Sloanea
 genus XV. Ablania
 genus XIV. Gyrostemon
 genus XVII. Christiana
 genus XVIII. Alegria
 genus XIX. Luhea [sic, now: Luehea]
 genus XX. Vatica
 genus XXI. Espera
 genus XXII. Wikstroemia
 genus XXIII. Berrya

According to APG II system, the current placement of these genera is mostly in the Malvaceae sensu lato, but with Gyrostemon moved to family Gyrostemonaceae, Muntingia to family Muntingiaceae, Sloanea to family Elaeocarpaceae, Vatica to family Dipterocarpaceae and Wikstroemia to family Thymelaeaceae (possibly reduced to a synonym of Daphne).  The genus Abatia is assigned to the family Salicaceae sensu lato.

Bentham & Hooker system
The family reached perhaps its widest circumscription in the Bentham & Hooker system:
 family XXXIII Tiliaceae
 series A. Holopetalae
 tribus I. Brownlowieae
 genus 1. Brownlowia
 genus 2. Pentace
 genus 3. Diplodiscus
 genus 4. Pityranthe
 genus 5. Christiana
 genus 6. Berrya
 genus 7. Carpodiptera
 tribus II. Grewieae
 genus 8. Grewia
 genus 9. Columbia [sic, now Colona]
 genus 10. Diplophractum
 genus 11. Belotia
 genus 12. Erinocarpus
 genus 13. Triumfetta
 genus 14. Heliocarpus
 tribus III. Tilieae
 genus 15. Entelea
 genus 16. Sparrmannia
 genus 17. Honckenya [sic, see Clappertonia]
 genus 18. Corchorus
 genus 19. Corchoropsis
 genus 20. Luehea
 genus 21. Mollia
 genus 22. Trichospermum
 genus 23. Muntingia
 genus 24. Tilia
 genus 25. Leptonychia
 genus 26. Schoutenia
 tribus IV. Apeibeae
 genus 27. Glypilea
 genus 28. Apeiba
 series B. Heteropetalae
 tribus V. Prockieae
 genus 29. Prockia
 genus 30. Hasseltia
 genus 31. Plagiopteron
 genus 32? Ropalocarpus
 tribus VI. Sloanieae
 genus 33. Vallea
 genus 34. Sloanea
 genus 35. Echinocarpus
 genus 36. Antholoma
 tribus VII. Elaeocarpeae
 genus 37. Aristotelia
 genus 38. Elaeocarpus
 genus 39. Dubouzetia
 genus 40. Tricuspidaria

According to APG II system, the current placement of these genera is perhaps mostly in the Malvaceae sensu lato, but with Muntingia moved to family Muntingiaceae,  while tribes VI and VII form the core of family Elaeocarpaceae and tribe V has been moved to the family Salicaceae sensu lato.

The Hutchinson system follows the Bentham & Hooker system rather closely.

Cronquist system
In the Cronquist system (1981) the family includes some fifty genera, totalling around seven hundred species of trees and shrubs, rarely herbs, with a subcosmopolitan distribution. It may be separated from Malvaceae sensu stricto by the smooth surface of the pollen grains,  bilocular anthers, and the stamens free or in bundles (but not monadelphous)

Ancistrocarpus Oliv.
Apeiba Aubl.
Asterophorum Sprague
Berrya Roxb.
Brownlowia Roxb.
Burretiodendron Rehder
Carpodiptera Griseb.
Christiana DC.
Clappertonia Meisn.
Colona Cav.
Corchoropsis Siebold & Zucc.
Corchorus L.
Craigia W.W.Sm. & W.E.Evans
Desplatsia Bocq.
Dicraspidia Standl.
Diplodiscus Turcz.
Duboscia Bocquet
Eleutherostylis Burret
Entelea R.Br.
Erinocarpus Nimmo ex J.Graham
Glyphaea Hook.f.
Goethalsia Pittier
Grewia L.
Hainania Merr.
Heliocarpus L.
Hydrogaster Kuhlm.
Jarandersonia Kosterm.
Luehea Willd.
Lueheopsis Burret
Microcos L.
Mollia Mart.
Mortoniodendron Standl. & Steyerm.
Neotessmannia Burret
Pentace Hassk.
Pentaplaris L.O.Williams & Standl.
Petenaea Lundell
Pityranthe Thwaites
Pseudocorchorus Capuron
Schoutenia Korth.
Sicrea (Pierre) Hallier f.
Sparrmannia L.f.
Tetralix Griseb.
Tilia L.
Trichospermum Blume
Triumfetta L.
Vasivaea Baill.
Westphalina A.Robyns & Bamps

External links
Tiliaceae in L. Watson and M.J. Dallwitz (1992 onwards) The families of flowering plants: descriptions.

Malvales families
Historically recognized angiosperm families